Tyler Scott Morton (born 31 October 2002) is an English professional footballer who plays as a holding midfielder for Blackburn Rovers, on loan from   club Liverpool.

Club career 
Morton was playing for the Greenleas junior team when spotted by Liverpool academy coaches and joined the club aged seven, having also turned down an offer to join the Everton youth set-up.

He made his debut for the team's under-18 side in the 2019–20 season scoring his first goal in a 6–1 Merseyside derby victory over Everton. He started the 2020–21 season with the Under-18's before moving up to the Under-23 squad. He scored 10 times for Liverpool's Under-18 and Under-23 sides during the 2020–21 campaign and played a key role as the youth team reached the FA Youth Cup final.

In January 2021, he signed a new long-term contract with the club.

Morton made his first team debut in a pre-season friendly in July 2021 against Wacker Innsbruck, followed by his competitive debut for the Liverpool first team as a second-half substitute on 21 September 2021 in an EFL Cup match against Norwich City. On 20 November, he made his Premier League debut, coming on in the final minutes of a 4–0 home victory over Arsenal. Four days later, he made his UEFA Champions League debut in a home match against Porto, playing the full 90 minutes of the 2–0 win. On 19 December, Morton was given his first Premier League start, in which he played 60 minutes and was shown a yellow card in a 2–2 draw away to Tottenham Hotspur.

On 1 August 2022, Morton joined Blackburn Rovers on a season-long loan.

International career 
On 11 November 2021, Morton made his England U20 debut during a 2–0 defeat to Portugal in the 2021–22 Under 20 Elite League.

Career statistics

Club

International

Honours
Liverpool Academy
 Lancashire Senior Cup: 2021-22

References

External links
 

Living people
2002 births
Sportspeople from Wirral
Footballers from Merseyside
People from Wallasey
English footballers
Association football midfielders
Liverpool F.C. players
Blackburn Rovers F.C. players
Premier League players
English Football League players
England youth international footballers